Semantic realism may  refer to:

 Semantic realism (epistemology), a position criticized by Michael Dummett
 Semantic realism (philosophy of science), a position put forward by Stathis Psillos